Huang Jieyi (born 16 January 1993) is a Chinese canoeist. She competed in the women's K-1 200 metres event at the 2020 Summer Olympics.

References

External links
 

1993 births
Living people
Chinese female canoeists
Canoeists at the 2020 Summer Olympics
Olympic canoeists of China
Canoeists at the 2010 Summer Youth Olympics
Asian Games gold medalists for China
Asian Games medalists in canoeing
Canoeists at the 2014 Asian Games
Canoeists at the 2018 Asian Games
Medalists at the 2014 Asian Games
Medalists at the 2018 Asian Games